Waterparks is an American rock band formed in Houston, Texas in 2011. The group currently consists of lead vocalist and rhythm guitarist Awsten Knight, backing vocalist and lead guitarist Geoff Wigington, and backing vocalist and drummer Otto Wood.

The band has released three EPs, two of which were released independently while the third was released via Equal Vision. The band released their debut studio album, Double Dare, on November 4, 2016, via Equal Vision, then later their second studio album Entertainment under the same label on January 26, 2018. On May 23, 2019, the band announced that they had left Equal Vision and signed on with Hopeless. Their third studio album, entitled Fandom, was released on October 11, 2019. The band then signed with 300 Entertainment and their fourth studio album, Greatest Hits, was released on May 21, 2021. The band signed with Fueled by Ramen in 2022, and has teased their fifth studio album, Intellectual Property, set for release in 2023.

History

Early years and EPs (2011–2016)
The band was formed in 2011 by Awsten Knight and Gage Matthieu, who met while playing in different bands. The band was later joined by drummer Owen Marvin, guitarist Tommy Denley, and briefly, keyboardist Tyler Comer. This lineup soon dissipated before the band's first release. Their first EP, Airplane Conversations, was released independently on April 3, 2012, and was the only release with Matthieu and Marvin before they both left the band in 2012. Guitarist Geoff Wigington and drummer Otto Wood joined the band that same year following the prior departures. The band's first show was on August 17, 2012 at Warehouse Live in Houston alongside Invent, Animate, DWHB, and Life as Lions. The band continued performing at local venues throughout Texas over the following years. The band performed as a supporting act for pop musician Aaron Carter, opening his Houston tour date on May 11, 2013. Their second EP, Black Light, was released on June 5, 2014. The band also performed on the Houston dates of the Warped Tour in 2013 and 2015.

On November 6, 2015, the band signed with label Equal Vision Records. After searching for producers, the band chose twins Benji Madden and Joel Madden of Good Charlotte as their managers. On January 15, 2016, the group released an EP titled Cluster, co-produced by Benji Madden. Mikey Way, known as the bassist of My Chemical Romance, played bass for the EP. On November 19, 2015, the band performed with Good Charlotte during the group's comeback performance at The Troubadour in West Hollywood, California.

The group performed on the Black Cat Tour supporting Never Shout Never in 2016, and on every date of the 2016 Warped Tour. The band then embarked on the End The Madness Tour supporting Sleeping with Sirens in late 2016.

Double Dare and Entertainment (2016–2018)

The group released a single titled "Stupid For You" on August 31, 2016 in promotion of its debut album, Double Dare. They later released two additional singles, "Hawaii (Stay Awake)", and "Royal", before the album's release on November 4, 2016. In 2016, the band performed a cover of Hitchin' a Ride by Green Day and was featured on a 30th anniversary covers album for Green Day titled, Green Day: American Superhits!. "Gloom Boys" was made into the album's fourth and final single in 2017. 

In March 2017, the group joined fellow bands SWMRS and The Wrecks as supporting acts on All Time Low's tour of the United Kingdom and Ireland. Later, during the Summer of 2017, the groups reunited for All Time Low's Young Renegades Tour, this time touring the United States. Night Riots performed in place of SWMRS on the tour's Dallas and Houston dates.

On October 20, 2017, the band announced their second studio album, Entertainment, with a release date of January 26, 2018. Alongside Entertainment's announcement, the band released the album's first single, "Blonde". On December 13, 2017, the band released the second single from the album, titled "Lucky People". On January 17, 2018, Waterparks released the third and final single from Entertainment, titled "Not Warriors". The album was released on January 26, 2018 via Equal Vision. Entertainment peaked at No. 98 on the Billboard 200 chart on February 10, 2018.

Fandom and live album (2018–2020)

In 2019, the band performed a cover of "Beating Heart Baby" by Head Automatica and was featured on Rock Sound's covers album Worship And Tributes: Volume II.  On May 23, 2019, the band released "Turbulent", their first single off of their at the time, third album. Along with the album's title it was also announced that they got signed to Hopeless Records. On August 12, 2019, the band released the second single, "Watch What Happens Next", along with a music video and the announcement of the album to be released on October 11, 2019. On August 16, 2019, the band released their third single, "Dream Boy," along with a music video. On September 12, 2019, the fourth single, "[Reboot]" was released. On September 25, 2019, they released their fifth single for the album, "High Definition," along with a music video. The band's third studio album Fandom was released on October 11, 2019. On October 17, 2019, "Easy to Hate" was released as the sixth single, along with a music video.

On January 22, 2020, frontman Awsten Knight posted on Twitter that if a certain tweet was retweeted 20,000 times, that he would release a new Waterparks album that day. This goal was achieved within hours, subsequently forcing Knight to release a SoundCloud collection titled 1 (A Collection of Unreleased Home Demos, This is Not G, or Even an Album, Shut Up Enjoy), a demo album that consists of unreleased Waterparks demos, including songs Knight has teased on his Instagram some of which were "Lemonade", "Noise", and "Glitter Times". He states in the song "Life Is Puke (20,000)" that he never thought the tweet would actually make it to that many retweets and that "everyone is so mad at me."

When the band performed at the O2 Academy in Birmingham, England during the Fandom tour on January 27, 2020, they announced that the performance would be taped and released as a live album, with a companion concert film, that summer. The COVID-19 pandemic delayed the release until the fall, and Fandom: Live in the UK was officially released on November 27, 2020, formally marking the end of the Fandom era.

Greatest Hits (2020–2022)

On September 24, 2020, the band officially released a song entitled "Lowkey As Hell". This comes after Knight leaked the song the previous week on a live stream whilst cutting off his Fandom-era green hair himself. Following the song's official release, record label 300 Entertainment announced that they had signed the band.

On February 25, 2021, the band announced their fourth studio album Greatest Hits, along with the release of a new single titled "Snow Globe". The album was released on May 21, 2021. The next single, titled "Numb" was released on March 29, 2021, but was debuted on March 27 during the Anti Tour Performance. The fourth single, "You'd Be Paranoid Too (If Everyone Was Out To Get You)", was released on April 28 2021, sharing its title with an autobiography written by vocalist and rhythm guitarist Awsten Knight. The fifth single, "Just Kidding", was released on May 12, 2021. The sixth single, "Violet!", was released on May 19, 2021. A music video was released for the song on May 26, 2021.

Intellectual Property (2022–present)
On January 27, 2022, the band posted teasers for their upcoming fifth studio album. On April 7, 2022, the first single, "Funeral Grey" was announced, and was then subsequently released on May 13 as their first release under Fueled by Ramen. In 2022, the band's song "Telephone," from their 2019 album Fandom, was featured in episode three of the British TV series, Heartstopper. On July 5, 2022, the band announced the second single, "Self-Sabotage" to be released on July 7. The band also released a teaser of a new song titled "Brainwashed" that the band has been performing on tour. On August 8, 2022, the band released a music video for "Self-Sabotage". On August 30, 2022, the band debuted a new song live titled "Real Super Dark" from the upcoming album. On October 14, 2022, the band released the single "Fuck About It", featuring Blackbear. On November 23, 2022, the band announced the title of their upcoming fifth studio album, Intellectual Property. On December 1, 2022, the band released a music video for "Fuck About It". On January 26, 2023, the band released the album's fourth single, "Real Super Dark". The band also confirmed the released date for the album to be April 14, 2023. On March 10, 2023, the band released the album's fifth single, "Brainwashed".

Musical style and influences
Waterparks musical style has been mainly described as pop punk, pop rock, electropop, alternative rock, alternative pop, electronic rock, emo, neon pop, rock, and power pop. but also incorporates elements of punk, hip hop, rap, bubblegum pop electronic, indie, jazz, drum and bass, industrial, grunge, post-hardcore, dark pop, orchestral, emo rap, stadium rock, hyperpop, and lo-fi genres. The band is said to derive their unique sound through the addition of vocal modulation, layered synthesizers, and fast vocals to the traditional rock sound. Frontman Awsten has stated that he considers the group to be a rock band that has garnered significant inspiration from pop music. Since the departure of former bassist Gage Matthieu, the band has remained without a bass player in its official lineup, instead performing with a rotation of fill-in bass players or using pre-recorded backing tracks in live appearances. They have cited Sum 41, Blink-182, Good Charlotte, Kesha, My Chemical Romance, Green Day, Fall Out Boy, No Doubt, Kanye West, the Beach Boys, Donald Glover, Tyler, the Creator, Taylor Swift, Chance the Rapper, Linkin Park, Paramore, and Saves the Day as musical influences.

Band members

Current members 
 Awsten Knight – lead vocals, rhythm guitar, programming (2011–present)
 Geoff Wigington – lead guitar, backing vocals  (2012–present)
 Otto Wood – drums, backing vocals (2012–present)
  
Former members
 Gage Matthieu – bass (2011–2012)
 Owen Marvin – drums (2011–2012)
Tommy Denley – lead guitar (2011)
Tyler Comer – keyboards (2011)

Touring and session members
 Mikey Way – bass (2016–2018)

Timeline

Discography

Studio albums
Double Dare (2016)
Entertainment (2018)
Fandom (2019)
Greatest Hits (2021)
 Intellectual Property (2023)

Awards and nominations

References

External links
 
 

Pop punk groups from Texas
Rock music groups from Texas
American musical trios
Musical groups from Houston
Musical groups established in 2011
Equal Vision Records artists
2011 establishments in Texas